Zhao Jianguo (born 19 January 1988) is a Chinese race walker.

Achievements

See also 
China at the 2012 Summer Olympics - Athletics
Athletics at the 2012 Summer Olympics – Men's 50 kilometres walk

References

1988 births
Living people
Chinese male racewalkers
Athletes (track and field) at the 2012 Summer Olympics
Olympic athletes of China
Athletes from Gansu
People from Longxi County